Club Deportivo Cenicero is a Spanish football team based in Cenicero in the autonomous community of La Rioja. Founded in 1984, it plays in Regional Preferente. Its stadium is Campo de Fútbol Las Viñas with a capacity of 1,200 seaters.

Season to season

5 seasons in Tercera División

External links
frfutbol.com profile  
Futbolme.com profile  

Football clubs in La Rioja (Spain)
Association football clubs established in 1984
Divisiones Regionales de Fútbol clubs
1984 establishments in Spain